Jacob David R. Clayton (born November 28, 2000), also known by his stage name, Jacob Rica, is a former Filipino/British child actor. He is half British. He is currently under GMA Artist Center (now Sparkle GMA Artist Center) until 2014 handled by director Maryo J. de los Reyes. He took part in the action adventure series  Zaido: Pulis Pangkalawakan aired on GMA Network. In 2008, he joined the main cast of the eleventh installment of Sine Novela Saan Darating Ang Umaga?, Magkano Ba ang Pag-ibig? and Regular TV Host Walang Tulugan, GMA Network's evening variety show.

Career
In 2009 he guested on ABS-CBN as young Roldan Legazpi on Flash Bomba and Michael on May Bukas Pa but he has never signed his contract under Star Magic. Sometime later, his latest role is the lead of Young Antonio Pelaez/Zorro in the TV adaptation of Zorro, young Fernando Jose of Rosalinda and young Daryl in Kaya Kong Abutin Ang Langit. Jacob decided to finished his contract in 2014 and he finally quits from show business.

Filmography

Television

Movies

References

External links

Filipino male child actors
21st-century Filipino male actors
Living people
2000 births
People from Olongapo